The 1875 CCNY Lavender football team was an American football team that represented the City College of New York during the 1875 college football season. The team had no known coach and played three or four games, all losses.

Schedule

References

CCNY
CCNY Beavers football seasons
College football winless seasons
CCNY Lavender football